Chris Brown is a retired English-American footballer who spent most of his career in the USL A-League. He is the co-head coach of the USF Bulls women's soccer team.

Player

Youth
Born in England, Brown moved to the United States as a child and settled in San Antonio, Texas.  In 1990, he began his collegiate career at the University of North Carolina at Charlotte.  In 1991, he transferred to American University.

Professional
In 1994, Brown moved to Germany and signed with TuS Celle.  In 1995, he returned to the United States where he finished the 1995 USISL outdoor season with the Washington Mustangs.  He then signed with the Baltimore Bays for the 1995–1996 USISL indoor season.  In 1996, he joined the Richmond Kickers for one season.  In the fall of 1996, Brown moved indoors with the Tampa Bay Terror of the National Professional Soccer League.  He signed with the New Orleans Riverboat Gamblers on April 4, 1997.  In 1998, the Gamblers became the New Orleans Storm.  That season, Brown went on loan to the Dallas Burn of Major League Soccer for one game.  On February 24, 1999, he signed with the Maryland Mania.  In 2000, Brown returned to the Kickers and remained with them until his retirement at the end of the 2004 season.

Coach
In 1997, Brown began his coaching career as an assistant with the men's soccer team at the University of Tampa. In 1998, he moved to University of Maryland, Baltimore County, where he was an assistant with the women's team.
In 2000, he became an assistant coach at Virginia Commonwealth University. In 2003 and 2004, Brown served as a player-assistant coach with the Richmond Kickers in addition to his collegiate coaching responsibilities. In 2007, he became an assistant at the University of South Florida.  In 2008, he became co-head coach with his wife Denise Schilte.  In 2010, he coached the Guyana women's national football team. In May 2021 Brown was announced as the head coach of Puerto Rico women's national football team in time to prepare for the 2023 FIFA Women's World Cup in Australia and New Zealand

References

External links
USF: Chris Brown

Living people
1971 births
American Eagles men's soccer players
American soccer coaches
American soccer players
American expatriate soccer players in Germany
Baltimore Bays (1993–1998) players
Charlotte 49ers men's soccer players
FC Dallas players
Major League Soccer players
Maryland Mania players
National Professional Soccer League (1984–2001) players
New Orleans Riverboat Gamblers players
New Orleans Storm players
Richmond Kickers players
Tampa Bay Terror players
TuS Celle FC players
A-League (1995–2004) players
USISL players
Association football defenders
Sportspeople from San Antonio
Soccer players from San Antonio
Player-coaches
Washington Mustangs players
Tampa Spartans men's soccer coaches
UMBC Retrievers women's soccer coaches
VCU Rams women's soccer coaches
Richmond Kickers coaches
South Florida Bulls women's soccer coaches
Expatriate football managers in Guyana
American expatriate soccer coaches
American expatriate soccer players